Brian Scott O'Connor (who has his nickname, "Big Hands" or "Marc McFettridge", because of his very large hands) is best known for his role as bass guitarist for rock band Eagles of Death Metal. He appears on Death By Sexy, Heart On, and is included in the video for "I Want You So Hard (Boy's Bad News)".

Biography
Brian is a Pacific Northwest original, growing up in the rural community of Carrolls between Kalama and Kelso-Longview, Washington.  As a young boy, he played in a band named, "Shanna and the Country Bugs" with his father and his siblings. He worked many years in the construction industry before coming into his success with EODM.

In June 2010, it was announced in the media that Brian had been diagnosed with an unspecified cancer, for which he would be undergoing chemotherapy.

A statement from O'Connor in regard to his diagnoses:
"In regards to my current health situation, with the remarkable support and love from my amazing friends and family, I am receiving the best medical and moral attention one could ask for. I cannot thank everyone enough for their continued support and involvement. I am excited for my full recovery and look forward to getting back to what I love most, melting face with my bass. I'm feeling great, after all, I am half unicorn. Keep ya posted."

During this time, Dean Fertita from Queens of the Stone Age and The Dead Weather filled in on bass. Long time friend and collaborator Josh Homme, along with Dave Grohl and John Paul Jones of Them Crooked Vultures announced a concert at the Brixton Academy in London to raise money for O'Connor's treatment.

On August 12, 2010, Queens of The Stone Age put together a concert at the Nokia Club in Los Angeles to raise funds for O'Connor. Mark Lanegan sang four encore songs with the band.

In 2013, Brian played the character Talan Gwynek in the werewolf movie Wer.

Musical equipment
With Eagles of Death Metal he uses a worn Fender Precision Bass into Orange and Ampeg SVT bass amplifiers through Orange bass cabinets. He also uses the ProCo Rat distortion pedal as well as other pedals.

Discography
With Eagles of Death Metal
Death by Sexy (2006)
Heart On (2008)

With Unkle
Nights Temper EP (2007)
War Stories (2007)

With Masters of Reality
Pine Cross Dover (2009)

Other appearances
The Desert Sessions - Volumes 9 & 10 (2003)
Axis of Justice - Concert Series - Volume 1 (2004)
Peaches - Impeach My Bush (2006)
Chris Goss - "Rancho De La Luna Sessions" (2008)
Mojave Lords - "Unfuckwithable" (2014)
Sweethead - Descent To The Surface (2016)

References

External links
Official Eagles of Death Metal Website

Year of birth missing (living people)
Living people
American bass guitarists
American male singers
Singers from Washington (state)
American rock musicians
People from Cowlitz County, Washington
American male bass guitarists
Eagles of Death Metal members